Symphlebia erratum is a moth in the subfamily Arctiinae. It was described by Schaus in 1933. It is found in Venezuela.

References

Moths described in 1933
erratum